The following highways are numbered 828:

United States